The 2018 F4 British Championship was a multi-event, Formula 4 open-wheel single seater motor racing championship held across United Kingdom. The championship featured a mix of professional motor racing teams and privately funded drivers, competing in Formula 4 cars that conformed to the technical regulations for the championship. This, the fourth season, following on from the British Formula Ford Championship, was the fourth year that the cars conformed to the FIA's Formula 4 regulations. Part of the TOCA tour, it formed part of the extensive program of support categories built up around the BTCC centrepiece.

The season commenced on 7 April at Brands Hatch – on the circuit's Indy configuration – and concluded on 30 September at the same venue, utilising the Grand Prix circuit, after thirty races held at ten meetings, all in support of the 2018 British Touring Car Championship.

Teams and drivers
All teams were British-registered.

Race calendar
The calendar was announced on 5 June 2017. All races were held in the United Kingdom.

Championship standings

Points were awarded as follows:

Drivers' standings

Teams Cup
Each team nominated two drivers to score points before every round. All non-nominated drivers were ignored.

References

External links
 

F4 British Championship seasons
British F4
F4 British Championship
British F4